Propappus is a genus of annelids belonging to the monotypic family Propappidae.

Species:

Propappus arhyncotus 
Propappus glandulosus 
Propappus volki

References

Annelids